Mullavalliyum Thenmavum is a 2003 Indian Malayalam-language romance film directed by V. K. Prakash, starring Kunchacko Boban, Indrajith Sukumaran and Chaya Singh.

Plot

Shelly and his girlfriend, Rajasree are in love, but Rajasree's mother is against their romance, since Shelly is a Christian and an orphan. They elope with the help of Shelly's uncle Dr. Alex. Rajasree, but decides that they will not have sexual relationship until her mother approves the marriage. She said she is giving her mother one year to change her mind. Initially her mother is against the marriage, but as the year ends, she relents.

On that day, Shelly falls from the sculpture which he was making and is paralysed. He asks Rajasree to leave him and have a good life, but she refuses. Dr. Alex brings an artist named Andre to finish Shelly's sculpture. Andre is soon joined by his girlfriend Eva. Rajasree does not like them because of their strange behaviour. One day Andre tries to rape Rajasree in front of the paralysed Shelly. Shelly cries in agony, and finally he stands up and fights Andre. Shelly then recovers fully. He learns that Dr. Alex suggested that Andre provoke him, hoping to trigger the change.

Cast
Kunchacko Boban as Shelly 
Indrajith Sukumaran as Andrew 
Chaya Singh as Rajasree / Minnu
Kalyani as Thenmozhi 
Geethu Mohandas as Eva Cherian  
Lalu Alex as Dr. Alex 
Srividya as Kanakambal 
Ashokan as Chinnarangan 
Mala Aravindan as Gopalan Nair 
Mamukkoya as Postman
 Ramya Sudha

Songs 
The songs were penned by Gireesh Puthenchery and were composed by Ouseppachan.

References

External links
 

2000s Malayalam-language films
2003 films
2000s teen romance films
Indian teen romance films
Films scored by Ouseppachan
Films directed by V. K. Prakash